Sympistis funebris is a moth of the  family Noctuidae. It is found in Fennoscandia, the Alps, northern Russia through Siberia to Japan. It is also found in the northern parts of North America.

The wingspan is 25–27 mm.

The larvae feed on Betula nana and Vaccinium species, including Vaccinium uliginosum.

Subspecies

Sympistis funebris funebris
Sympistis funesta cocklei

External links

Fauna Europaea
Lepiforum.de

funebris
Moths of Japan
Moths of Europe
Moths of North America
Taxa named by Jacob Hübner
Moths described in 1809